Crichton (located in Mobile, Alabama) consists of two neighbourhoods, North Crichton and South Crichton.

Population 
At a 2019 Census, Crichton had a population of 4,182.

History 
Crichton is the site of the alleged Crichton Leprechaun sighting in 2006.

References

Neighborhoods in Mobile, Alabama